Safedchashma (Russian and Tajik: Сафедчашма, formerly Samsolik) is a jamoat in Tajikistan. It is located in Nurobod District, one of the Districts of Republican Subordination. The jamoat has a total population of 8,015 (2015).

Notes

References

Populated places in Districts of Republican Subordination
Jamoats of Tajikistan